"Eve of the Daleks" is the first of the 2022 specials of the British science fiction television programme Doctor Who, which was broadcast on BBC One on 1 January 2022. It was written by Chris Chibnall, and directed by Annetta Laufer.  The episode follows the thirteenth series as a New Year’s Day special.

The episode stars Jodie Whittaker as the Thirteenth Doctor, alongside Mandip Gill and John Bishop as her companions Yasmin Khan and Dan Lewis, respectively.

Plot 
Shortly before midnight on New Year's Eve, Nick turns up at a storage facility in Manchester owned and operated by Sarah, on whom he has a crush. Meanwhile, the Doctor attempts to reset the TARDIS to remove the damage and anomalies caused by the Flux. Intending to spend time at a beach, she, Yaz, and Dan exit in the storage facility instead. Unbeknownst to the Doctor, the TARDIS' reset triggers a time loop.

Nick encounters an Executioner Dalek which kills him, and later the Doctor, Yaz, Dan, and Sarah. Time resets, with Sarah and Nick both trying to save the other, but failing and dying upon seeing the Dalek again. The Doctor realises that each reset shortens the time loop by one minute and speculates that the loop will collapse at midnight. The Daleks reveal they have detected the TARDIS' energy signature and have come to execute the Doctor for her actions in "The Vanquishers". Both the Doctor's group and the Daleks attempt to learn from the previous loops in order to anticipate their enemy's next moves. During the loops, Nick confesses returning each year to see Sarah while Dan points out to the Doctor that Yaz has feelings for her.

Using illegal fireworks and other materials stored in the facility by another employee, the group decide to create a trap that will bring down the facility when fired upon. To prevent the Daleks from anticipating the move, they behave completely differently in the second-to-last loop, before dying again. At the last minute before midnight, they place the materials, along with Sarah's mobile phone, in the wrong place while escaping through the basement. Triggered by hearing Sarah's mother calling her phone, the Daleks shoot the trap and ignite the fireworks, which causes the facility to explode and bury the Daleks underneath.

The TARDIS finishes restructuring and the Doctor and her companions leave to find the lost treasure of the Flor de la Mar, while Sarah and Nick decide to travel the world together.

Production

Development 
"Eve of the Daleks" was written by showrunner and executive producer Chris Chibnall. The episode introduces a new version of the Daleks referred to as Executioner Daleks, and uses the format of a time loop.

Casting 
Jodie Whittaker stars as the Thirteenth Doctor, alongside Mandip Gill as Yasmin Khan and John Bishop as Dan Lewis. The episode features guest stars Aisling Bea and Adjani Salmon, and also features Pauline McLynn. Jonny Dixon, who last appeared in "The Woman Who Fell to Earth" (2018), returned to portray Karl.

Filming 
The episode was directed by Annetta Laufer. The first two 2022 specials were filmed in the same production run as the thirteenth series. Filming for those specials concluded in August 2021.

Broadcast and reception

Broadcast 
"Eve of the Daleks" aired on 1 January 2022, and is the first of the three 2022 specials.

Ratings 
The episode was watched by 3.21 million viewers overnight, becoming the sixth most-watched programme of the day. The episode received an Audience Appreciation Index score of 77. Within seven days the total number of viewers rose to 4.39 million, ranking as the 25th most viewed programme for the week.

Critical reception 
On Metacritic, a review aggregator website, the episode received "generally favorable reviews" based on an average score of 76 out of 100 from 6 reviews. On Rotten Tomatoes, another aggregator, 82% of 11 critics gave the episode a positive review, with an average rating of 7.20 out of 10. The site's consensus reads "Doctor Who scales back and is all the better for it with a New Year's special that finds fresh notes within a self-contained yarn."

Home media 
"Eve of the Daleks" and "Legend of the Sea Devils" received a joint DVD and Blu-ray release in Region 2/B on 23 May 2022, in Region 1/A on 28 June 2022, and in Region 4/B on 13 July 2022. The episode was included in the home media set for the 2022 specials, to be released in Region 2/B on 7 November 2022.

Soundtrack 

On 18 November 2022, composer Segun Akinola announced that selected pieces of the score from this special would be digitally released on 2 December 2022. A physical CD release containing all 3 soundtracks of the 2022 specials is also set for release on 13 January 2023.

References

External links 

 
 
 

2022 British television episodes
Dalek television stories
Thirteenth Doctor episodes
Time loop television episodes
New Year's television specials
Fiction set in 2021
Manchester in fiction